Mission is a 1961 Soviet drama film directed by Yuri Yegorov.

Plot 
The film tells about the engineer-designer of agricultural machinery, who suddenly finds out that the tractor that he invented does not work, and he goes to help the collective farmers.

Cast 
 Oleg Efremov
 Dodo Abashidze
 Svetlana Karpinskaya
 Valeri Malyshev
 Gennadi Frolov
 Olga Lysenko
 Aleksey Mironov
 Ivan Lapikov		
 Mariya Andrianova
 Yevgeny Vesnik
 Emmanuil Geller

References

External links 
 

1961 films
1960s Russian-language films
Soviet drama films